Kensington High School is a historic high school located in the Kensington neighborhood of Philadelphia, Pennsylvania. It is part of the School District of Philadelphia. The building was designed by Henry deCourcy Richards and built in 1916–1917.  It is a -story, nine-bay by seven-bay, brick building on a raised basement in the Tudor Revival style. It features limestone sills and lintels and a brick parapet.

The building was added to the National Register of Historic Places in 1988 as the Kensington High School for Girls.

References

External links

1917 establishments in Pennsylvania
Public high schools in Pennsylvania
Kensington, Philadelphia
School buildings completed in 1917
School buildings on the National Register of Historic Places in Philadelphia
Tudor Revival architecture in Pennsylvania
School District of Philadelphia
High schools in Philadelphia
History of women in Pennsylvania